10 let Kasakhstan is a village located in the Koksu District of Almaty Region in southeastern Kazakhstan. Population:

References 

Populated places in Almaty Region